Kardonovka is a rural locality (a selo) and the administrative centre of Kardonovsky Selsoviet, Kizlyarsky District, Republic of Dagestan, Russia. The population was 1,875 as of 2010. There are 10 streets.

Geography 
Kardonovka is located 12 km southeast of Kizlyar (the district's administrative centre) by road. Dagestanskoye and Yefimovka are the nearest rural localities.

Nationalities 
Avars, Dargins, Russians, Laks and Lezgins live there.

References 

Rural localities in Kizlyarsky District